The Kanpur–Varanasi Varuna Express is an Indian Railways Express train which runs between the cities of Kanpur and Varanasi . It was extended in 2011 from Lucknow to Kanpur. The train runs with 17 coaches. It covers the 355 km distance in 7  hours and 20 minutes from Kanpur to Varanasi and 6 hours 40 minutes from Varanasi to Kanpur.
The train was extended to Kanpur in Railway Budget 2011–12.

Time table (important halts)

 to Varanasi-24228

From Varanasi to Kanpur Central-24227

See also
 Shram Shakti Express
 Kanpur–New Delhi Shatabdi Express
 Chitrakootdham (Karwi)–Kanpur Intercity Express (via Allahabad)
 Kanpur
 Lucknow–Kanpur Suburban Railway

External links

Trains from Kanpur
Passenger trains originating from Varanasi
Express trains in India